David Albahari (born 15 March 1948) is a Serbian writer, residing in Calgary, Alberta, Canada. Albahari writes mainly novels and short stories in the Serbian language. He is also an established translator from English into Serbian. He is a member of the Serbian Academy of Sciences and Arts and a University of Belgrade graduate.

Biography
Born in Peć, in the former Yugoslav region of Kosovo to a Sephardic Jewish family, Albahari published the first collection of short stories Porodično vreme (Family Time) in 1973. He became better known to wider audience in 1982 with a volume Opis smrti (Description of Death) for which he got Ivo Andrić award. In 1991 he became the chair of the Federation of Jewish Communes of Yugoslavia, and worked on evacuation of the Jewish population from besieged Sarajevo. In 1994, he moved with his family to Calgary in the Canadian province of Alberta, where he still lives. He continues to write and publish in the Serbian language.

In the late 1980s, Albahari initiated the first formal petition to legalize marijuana in Yugoslavia.

Awards
In 2012 he was awarded the Vilenica Prize.  He also received the following awards: Ivo Andrić Award (1982), Stanislav Vinaver Award (1993), NIN Prize (1996), National Library of Serbia Award for bestseller (1996), International Balkanika Award (1996), Bridge Berlin Award (1998), City of Belgrade Award (2005) and Isidora Sekulić Award (2014).

On 29 July 2016, Albahari won the first award at the "Druga prikazna" ("Another Story") literary festival in Skopje, Macedonia.

Albahari has been contributing to Geist magazine.

Works
His books have been translated into several languages and eight of them are available in English:

Words Are Something Else (1996)
Tsing (1997)
Bait (2001)
Gotz and Meyer (2003, United Kingdom) (2005, United States)
Snow Man (2005)
Leeches (2011)
Globetrotter (2014)
Learning Cyrillic (2014)
 Checkpoint (2018).

References

External links

 Homepage in Serbian and English
Voices on Antisemitism Interview with David Albahari from the U.S. Holocaust Memorial Museum
Biography at Internationales Literaturfestival Berlin
 "Marijuana March in Belgrade"
 David Albahari at Geist.com
 Biography at Zandonai Editore
 Zink, Emanuela Zandonai Editore, Rovereto 2009
 L’esca (original title: "Mamac"), Emanuela Zandonai Editore, Rovereto 2008

1948 births
Living people
Writers from Peja
Serbian novelists
Serbian translators
English–Serbian translators
Serbian Sephardi Jews
University of Belgrade Faculty of Philology alumni
Members of the Serbian Academy of Sciences and Arts
Writers from Calgary
Jewish writers
Serbian male short story writers
Serbian short story writers
Canadian cannabis activists
Male novelists
International Writing Program alumni
Serbian emigrants to Canada
Peja
Jewish Kosovan history